Alan Bruce Sanborn (born July 21, 1957) is a retired politician from the U.S. state of Michigan, serving parts of three terms in both the Michigan House of Representatives and Michigan Senate.

Biography
Sanborn is the son of Lois and Kenneth Sanborn. Kenneth Sanborn is a former member of the Michigan House of Representatives, former Circuit Court judge, and one of the attorneys who undertook the successful defense of Milo Radulovich in 1953. The Radulovich case was a major factor in helping to turn public opinion in the United States against McCarthyism.

Sanborn was born and raised in Mount Clemens, Michigan. He attended Michigan State University and graduated with a B.S. in social science with a minor in political science. He married Lori McQuiston on August 6, 1982. Sanborn and his ex-wife have three children.

Political career
Sanborn worked from 1978 to 1998 as a Macomb County probation officer. In 1996, Sanborn challenged and lost to incumbent David Jaye in the Republican primary for the 32nd District of the Michigan House of Representatives. In a special election in February 1998, Sanborn was elected to the seat after Jaye resigned to run for an open State Senate seat.

In 2001, after Jaye became the first member of the Michigan Legislature to be expelled from office,
 Sanborn came out on top of a field of thirteen Republican candidates, including Jaye, in a primary special election held September 11, 2001. In the heavily Republican district, Sanborn easily won the general special election on November 6, 2001.

Sanborn was re-elected in 2002, 2004 and 2006, and was named by Lansing-based political newsletter Inside Michigan Politics as "Michigan's Most Conservative Legislator" in 2003, 2004, and 2005. On January 1, 2011, Sanborn's term in the Senate officially came to an end, though his political aspirations did not. After returning to work as a juvenile probation officer for Macomb County, he put his hat in the ring for former Rep. Candice Miller's seat in Congress. After an unsuccessful run, he retired from his position with the county in 2018 to establish a property rental business in Lexington, Michigan.
 
His more notable legislative achievements include "Lisa's Law" (which protects probation officers) and a bill allowing visitation rights to grandparents.

Congressional Campaign
In March 2015, 7-term incumbent U.S. Representative Candice Miller shocked political pundits by announcing her intentions to retire at the end of her current term and not seek an 8th term in 2016 in Michigan's 10th congressional district. Sanborn was amongst the first candidates to be mentioned as a possible successor to Miller. He formed an exploratory committee on March 30, 2015, which gave him the ability to raise and spend money for a possible Congressional campaign and formally announced his candidacy on April 21, 2015.

Sanborn finished third in a five-person field, taking 16 percent of the vote, finishing behind winner Paul Mitchell, who took 37 percent of the vote, and state Sen. Phil Pavlov, who took 28 percent.

Electoral history

References

1957 births
Living people
Republican Party members of the Michigan House of Representatives
Republican Party Michigan state senators
People from Mount Clemens, Michigan
Michigan State University alumni